In corporate finance, the pecking order theory (or pecking order model) postulates that the cost of financing increases with asymmetric information.

Financing comes from three sources, internal funds, debt and new equity. Companies prioritize their sources of financing, first preferring internal financing, and then debt, lastly raising equity as a "last resort". Hence: internal financing is used first; when that is depleted, then debt is issued; and when it is no longer sensible to issue any more debt, equity is issued. This theory maintains that businesses adhere to a hierarchy of financing sources and prefer internal financing when available, and debt is preferred over equity if external financing is required (equity would mean issuing shares which meant 'bringing external ownership' into the company). Thus, the form of debt a firm chooses can act as a signal of its need for external finance.

The pecking order theory is popularized by Myers and Majluf (1984) where they argue that equity is a less preferred means to raise capital because when managers (who are assumed to know better about true condition of the firm than investors) issue new equity, investors believe that managers think that the firm is overvalued and managers are taking advantage of this over-valuation. As a result, investors will place a lower value to the new equity issuance.

History
Pecking order theory was first suggested by Donaldson in 1961 and it was modified by Stewart C. Myers and Nicolas Majluf in 1984.  It states that companies prioritize their sources of financing (from internal financing to equity) according to the cost of financing, preferring to raise equity as a financing means of last resort. Hence, internal funds are used first, and when that is depleted, debt is issued, and when it is not sensible to issue any more debt, equity is issued.

Theory
Pecking order theory starts with asymmetric information as managers know more about their company's prospects, risks and value than outside investors. Asymmetric information affects the choice between internal and external financing and between the issue of debt or equity. Therefore, there exists a pecking order for the financing of new projects.

Asymmetric information favours the issue of debt over equity as the issue of debt signals the board's confidence that an investment is profitable and that the current stock price is undervalued (were stock price over-valued, the issue of equity would be favoured).  The issue of equity would signal a lack of confidence in the board and that they feel the share price is over-valued. An issue of equity would therefore lead to a drop in share price.  This does not however apply to high-tech industries where the issue of equity is preferable due to the high cost of debt issue as assets are intangible.

Evidence
Tests of the pecking order theory have not been able to show that it is of first-order importance in determining a firm's capital structure. However, several authors have found that there are instances where it is a good approximation of reality. Zeidan, Galil and Shapir (2018) document that owners of private firms in Brazil follow the pecking order theory, and also Myers and Shyam-Sunder (1999) find that some features of the data are better explained by the pecking order than by the trade-off theory. Frank and Goyal show, among other things, that pecking order theory fails where it should hold, namely for small firms where information asymmetry is presumably an important problem.

Profitability and debt ratios
The pecking order theory explains the inverse relationship between profitability and debt ratios:

 Firms prefer internal financing.
 They adapt their target dividend payout ratios to their investment opportunities, while trying to avoid sudden changes in dividends.
 Sticky dividend policies, plus unpredictable fluctuations in profits and investment opportunities, mean that internally generated cash flow is sometimes more than capital expenditures and at other times less. If it is more, the firm pays off the debt or invests in marketable securities. If it is less, the firm first draws down its cash balance or sells its marketable securities, rather than reduce dividends.
 If external financing is required, firms issue the safest security first. That is, they start with debt, then possibly hybrid securities such as convertible bonds, then perhaps equity as a last resort. In addition, issue costs are least for internal funds, low for debt and highest for equity. There is also the negative signaling to the stock market associated with issuing equity, positive signaling associated with debt.

See also
Capital structure substitution theory
Corporate finance
Cost of capital
Market timing hypothesis
Trade-off theory of capital structure

References

Corporate finance
Asymmetric information
Debt
Finance theories